Ansonia High School is a public high school in Ansonia, Ohio, USA. It is the only high school in the Ansonia Local Schools District.

See also
Education in the United States
List of high schools in Ohio

References

External links
 District website

High schools in Darke County, Ohio
Public high schools in Ohio